Alexandra Vasilevna Artyukhina (Russian: Александра Васильевна Артюхина; 6 November 1889 – 7 April 1969) was an early Russian Bolshevik and revolutionary who rose to sit on the Secretariat of the CPSU Central Committee, but was brought down by Joseph Stalin's purges in the late 1930s.

Life and career
The child of textile workers, Artyukhina was born at Vyshny Volochyok. She became a dressmaker's apprentice at age ten and a mill worker by 17.  She joined the Communist labor movement in Russia, and was forced into exile at age 20 - probably in 1909.  After three years, she returned to Russia and resumed her work, both in textiles and in union organizing.

She was active during the Revolution and rose through the ranks to sit as an alternate member on the Secretariat of the CPSU Central Committee from 1926 to 1930.  She was also the last head of Zhenotdel. On March 1, 1931, international journalists noticed Artukhina as the first woman to sit on the Soviet Supreme Court.  

She assumed leadership of the Cotton Textile Workers Union when a Commissar of light industry, Isadore Lubimoff, was removed.  A collective farm was named for her.

Her industry fell 11% short of its production goal for the first quarter of 1938.  Artukhina and her subordinates were charged with allowing anti-Soviet wreckers to spread their corruption.  She was accused of approving the same quotas for different machines, allowing the neglect of machines, and unnecessarily complicated paperwork.  

After Stalin's death Artyukhina was rehabilitated. She was named a Hero of Socialist Labor in 1960, to commemorate the 50th anniversary of International Women's Day, and lies buried in the Novodevichy Cemetery.

Honours and awards
 Hero of Socialist Labour (7 March 1960)
 Three Orders of Lenin

References
The information in this article came from New York Times articles dated March 2, 1931 and May 23, 1938. The latter refers to the Soviet workers' newspaper Trud as its source.

Bibliography 
 Scheide, Carmen: "'Born in October': The Life and Thought of Aleksandra Vasilevna Artyukhina, 1889−1969", in: Ilic, Melanie: Women in the Stalin Era, Houndmills 2001, pages 9-28.

External links
 Biography and photograph

1889 births
1969 deaths
People from Vyshny Volochyok
People from Vyshnevolotsky Uyezd
Russian Social Democratic Labour Party members
Old Bolsheviks
Central Committee of the Communist Party of the Soviet Union members
Textile workers
Heroes of Socialist Labour
Recipients of the Order of Lenin
Burials at Novodevichy Cemetery
Female revolutionaries